Matt Bassuener (born April 8, 1984) is an American football quarterback who is currently a free agent. He was signed by the Louisville Fire as an undrafted free agent in 2008. He played college football at Georgetown University. He has played professionally in the Vaahteraliiga Finland, for the Seinäjoki Crocodiles and in Sweden Superserien for the Uppsala 86ers. Bassuener was part of the U.S. National Team that won the 2011 IFAF World Championship.

References

External links
Georgetown bio 
Arena Football League bio 

1984 births
Living people
American football quarterbacks
Georgetown Hoyas football players
Louisville Fire players
Amarillo Dusters players
Fairbanks Grizzlies players
Iowa Barnstormers players
Tulsa Talons players
Cleveland Gladiators players
San Antonio Talons players
Spokane Shock players
Los Angeles Kiss players
Players of American football from Wisconsin
American expatriate players of American football
People from Wood County, Wisconsin
American expatriate sportspeople in Finland